The 2006 Towson Tigers football team represented Towson University in the 2006 NCAA Division I FCS football season. They were led by 15th-year head coach Gordy Combs and played their home games at Johnny Unitas Stadium. They played as a member of the Atlantic 10 Conference. They finished the season 7–4, 4–4 in A-10 play to finish in third place in the South division.

Schedule

References

Towson
Towson Tigers football seasons
Towson Tigers football